Men's 5000m races for blind & visually impaired athletes at the 2004 Summer Paralympics were held in the Athens Olympic Stadium on 23 & 24 September. Events were held in three disability classes, each class running a single race.

T11

The T11 event was won by Henry Wanyoike, representing .

Final Round
24 Sept. 2004, 20:20

T12

The T12 event was won by Maher Bouallegue, representing .

Final Round
24 Sept. 2004, 21:05

T13

The T13 event was won by Joseph L. Ngorialuk, representing .

Final Round
23 Sept. 2004, 20:10

References

M